The Nangya Jeong clan is a Korean clan. Their Bon-gwan is in Langya, Shandong, China, known as Nangya in Korean. Their founder was  who was from Langya, Shandong. He was a Jinshi (imperial examination) at the end of Ming dynasty.

See also 
 Korean clan names of foreign origin

References

External links 
 

 
Korean clan names of Chinese origin